"Jag och min far" is a song written and recorded by Olle Ljungström, and released as a single in 1997 as well as on his 1998 studio album Det stora kalaset. A music video was also directed.

Lyrically, it deals with memories from a son and his father, who has died, exchanging knowledge within different topics. The song is not autobiographical in a literal sense; Ljungström's father was alive at the time, although the two had been out of touch for several years.

In 2008, it was recorded by Love Olzon on the tribute album Andra sjunger Olle Ljungström and by Pernilla Andersson on the album Gör dig till hund.

In 2012, Magnus Uggla performed the song in the third season of Så mycket bättre. His recording became a Svensktoppen hit, subsequently charting from 23 December 2012 until 17 January 2016, spending a total of 161 weeks on the chart. It also peaked at number two on the Swedish Singles Chart.

Charts

Magnus Uggla recording

References 

1997 singles
Magnus Uggla songs
1997 songs
Swedish-language songs
Swedish songs